Sir Michael Scott  (19 May 1923 - 9 June 2004) was a British diplomat and colonial administrator.

Scott was educated at Dame Allan's School and then enrolled at Durham University. He was granted an emergency commission in the Durham Light Infantry in 1941 and then transferred to the British Indian Army in 1943, joining the Royal Gurkha Rifles and serving in this unit until 1947. During this time he became acquainted with the Urdu, Hindi, and Gurkhali languages.

Career
He joined the Colonial Office in 1949 and moved to the Commonwealth Relations Office in 1957 (which would later merge with the Foreign Office). He was First Secretary in Karachi (1958-1959); Deputy High Commissioner in Peshawar (1959-1962); Counsellor and Director, British Information Services in India, New Delhi (1963-1965); Head of East and Central Africa Department (1965-1968); and then Deputy High Commissioner in Nicosia (1968-1972).

Scott headed three missions in his career: he was Ambassador to Nepal (1974-1977); High Commissioner to Malawi (1977-1979); and briefly High Commissioner to Bangladesh (1980-1981). In retirement he became Secretary-General of the Royal Commonwealth Society (1983-1988).

Honours
  Knight Commander of the Royal Victorian Order (KCVO) - 1979
  Companion of the Order of St Michael and St George (CMG) - 1977

References

1923 births
2004 deaths
Royal Gurkha Rifles officers
Durham Light Infantry officers
British Army personnel of World War II
Indian Army personnel of World War II
British Indian Army officers
Members of HM Diplomatic Service
People educated at Dame Allan's School
Ambassadors of the United Kingdom to Nepal
High Commissioners of the United Kingdom to Malawi
High Commissioners of the United Kingdom to Bangladesh
Knights Commander of the Royal Victorian Order
Companions of the Order of St Michael and St George
Alumni of King's College, Newcastle
British Indian Army personnel
British expatriates in Pakistan
British people in colonial India
20th-century British diplomats
Civil servants in the Commonwealth Relations Office